This article lists political parties in Guam. 
Guam has a two-party system; however, many people are elected to local positions without open affiliation. In addition, some elective offices are required to be nonpartisan.

The parties

Democratic Party of Guam
Republican Party of Guam

See also
 Politics of Guam
 List of political parties by country
Political party strength in Guam

Guam
 
+Guam
Guam

Political parties